Charan Singh (1902–1987) was Prime Minister of India

Charan Singh may also refer to:

Maharaj Charan Singh Ji (1916–1990), fourth satguru of the Radha Soami Satsang Beas
Charan Jeath Singh, Fiji politician

See also 
Charran Singh (1935–2015), Indo-Trinidadian and Tobagonian cricketer